The Cabinet of François Fillon were the members appointed by Prime Minister of France Francois Fillon in his two terms between 2007 and 2012.

Fillon's First Government

From 17 May, to 18 June 2007.
 François Fillon – Prime Minister

Ministers

 Alain Juppé – Minister of State, Minister of Ecology and Sustainable Development and Planning (resigned on 17 June 2007 following his defeat in the legislative elections and thus non-reelection as a deputy for Bordeaux);
 Jean-Louis Borloo – Minister of the Economy, Finance and Employment;
 Michèle Alliot-Marie – Minister of the Interior, Overseas and Territorial Collectivities;
 Bernard Kouchner – Minister of Foreign and European Affairs;
 Brice Hortefeux – Minister of Immigration, Integration, National identity and Co-development;
 Rachida Dati – Keeper of the seals, Minister of Justice;
 Xavier Bertrand – Minister of Labour, Social Relations and Solidarity;
 Xavier Darcos – Minister of National Education;
 Valérie Pécresse – Minister of Higher Education and Research;
 Hervé Morin – Minister of Defence;
 Roselyne Bachelot-Narquin – Minister of Health, Youth Affairs and Sport;
 Christine Boutin – Minister of Housing and City;
 Christine Lagarde – Minister of Agriculture and Fishing;
 Christine Albanel – Minister of Culture and Communication – Spokeswoman of the Government;
 Éric Wœrth – Minister of Budget, Public Accounting and Civil Servants.

Secretaries of State

 Roger Karoutchi – Secretary of State for Relations with Parliament (under Fillon);
 Éric Besson – Secretary of State for Economic Prospective and Evaluation of Public Policies (under Fillon);
 Dominique Bussereau – Secretary of State for Transport (under Juppé);
 Jean-Pierre Jouyet – Secretary of State for European Affairs (under Kouchner).

High Commissioner

 Martin Hirsch – High Commissioner for Active Solidarities against Poverty.

Fillon's Second Government

Appointed on 19 June 2007
 François Fillon – Prime Minister.

Ministers

 Jean-Louis Borloo – Minister of State, Minister of Ecology and Sustainable Development and Planning;
 Michèle Alliot-Marie – Minister of the Interior, Overseas and Territorial Collectivities;
 Bernard Kouchner – Minister of Foreign and European Affairs;
 Christine Lagarde – Minister of the Economy, Finance and Employment;
 Brice Hortefeux – Minister of Immigration, Integration, National identity and Co-development;
 Rachida Dati – Keeper of the seals, Minister of Justice;
 Michel Barnier – Minister of Agriculture and Fishing;
 Xavier Bertrand – Minister of Labour, Social Relations and Solidarity;
 Xavier Darcos – Minister of National Education;
 Valérie Pécresse – Minister of Higher Education and Research;
 Hervé Morin – Minister of Defence;
 Roselyne Bachelot-Narquin – Minister of Health, Youth Affairs and Sport;
 Christine Boutin – Minister of Housing and City;
 Christine Albanel – Minister of Culture and Communication;
 Éric Wœrth – Minister of Budget, Public Accounting and Civil Servants.

Secretaries of State

 Roger Karoutchi – Secretary of State for Relations with Parliament (under Fillon);
 Jean-Pierre Jouyet – Secretary of State for European Affairs (under Kouchner);
 Laurent Wauquiez – Secretary of State, Spokesman of the Government (under Fillon);
 Éric Besson – Secretary of State for Economic Prospective and Evaluation of Public Policies (under Fillon);
 Valérie Létard – Secretary of State for Solidarity (under Bertrand);
 Dominique Bussereau – Secretary of State for Transport (under Borloo);
 Nathalie Kosciusko-Morizet – Secretary of State for Ecology (under Borloo);
 Christian Estrosi – Secretary of State for Overseas (under Alliot-Marie);
 André Santini – Secretary of State for Civil Servants (under Wœrth);
 Jean-Marie Bockel – Secretary of State for Cooperation and Francophony (under Kouchner);
 Hervé Novelli – Secretary of State for Companies and Foreign Commerce (under Lagarde);
 Fadela Amara – Secretary of State for Urban Policies (under Boutin);
 Alain Marleix – Secretary of State for Veterans (under Morin);
 Rama Yade – Secretary of State for Foreign Affairs and Human Rights (under Kouchner);
 Luc Chatel – Secretary of State for Consumer affairs and Tourism (under Lagarde);
 Bernard Laporte – Secretary of State for Sport (under Bachelot-Narquin).

High Commissioner
 Martin Hirsch – High Commissioner for Active Solidarities against Poverty.

Shuffles

Appointment of Secretary of State for Sport

22 October 2007
Bernard Laporte is appointed Secretary of State for Sport (under Bachelot-Narquin).

After Municipal Elections of 2008

18 March 2008
There was a shuffle of the secretaries of state following the municipal elections of 16 March 2008.

New Secretaries of State

Yves Jégo is appointed Secretary of State for Overseas (under Alliot-Marie) to replace Christian Estrosi;
Hubert Falco is appointed Secretary of State for development of the territory (under Borloo);
Nadine Morano is appointed Secretary of State for Family (under Bertrand);
Christian Blanc is appointed Secretary of State for the development of the «Région Capitale» (Region of Paris) (under Borloo);
Anne-Marie Idrac is appointed Secretary of State for Foreign Commerce (under Lagarde);
Alain Joyandet is appointed Secretary of State for Cooperation and Francophony to replace Jean-Marie Bockel (under Kouchner).

Changes of attributions – Ministers

 Jean-Louis Borloo – formerly Minister of State, Minister of Ecology and Sustainable Development and Planning becomes Minister of State, Minister of Ecology, Energy, Sustainable Development and Planning;
 Christine Lagarde – formerly Minister of the Economy, Finance and Employment becomes Minister of the Economy, Industry and Employment;
 Brice Hortefeux – formerly Minister of Immigration, Integration, National identity and Co-development becomes Minister of Immigration, Integration, National identity and Solidary development;
 Xavier Bertrand – formerly Minister of Labour, Social Relations and Solidarity becomes Minister of Labour, Social Relations, Family and Solidarity;
 Roselyne Bachelot-Narquin – formerly Minister of Health, Youth Affairs and Sport becomes Minister of Health, Youth Affairs, Sport and Associations.

Changes of attributions – Secretaries of State

Laurent Wauquiez formerly Spokesman of the Government, is appointed Secretary of State for Employment (under Lagarde);
Luc Chatel formerly Secretary of State for Consumer affairs and Tourism is appointed Secretary of State for Consumer affairs and Industry, Spokesman of the Government (under Lagarde);
 Éric Besson – Secretary of State for Economic Prospective and Evaluation of Public Policies is now also in charge of the Development of digital economy (under Fillon);
 Jean-Marie Bockel – formerly Secretary of State for Cooperation and Francophony (under Kouchner), becomes Secretary of State for Defense and Veterans (under Morin);
 Alain Marleix – formerly Secretary of State for Veterans (under Morin) becomes Secretary of State for Local Collectivities (under Alliot-Marie);
Bernard Laporte – formerly Secretary of State for Sport becomes Secretary of State for Sport, Youth and Associations (under Bachelot-Narquin);
 Hervé Novelli – formerly Secretary of State for Companies and Foreign Commerce (under Lagarde) becomes Secretary of State for commerce, craft, small and medium companies, tourism and services (under Lagarde).

In December 2008
Patrick Devedjian is appointed Minister under the Prime Minister in charge of the Implementation of the Recovery Plan;
Bruno Le Maire replaces Jean-Pierre Jouyet as Secretary of State for European Affairs.

In January 2009 – Xavier Bertrand becomes head of UMP
Brice Hortefeux becomes Minister of Labour, Social Relations, Solidarity and City to replace Xavier Bertrand;
Éric Besson becomes Minister of Immigration, Integration, National identity and Solidary development;
Nathalie Kosciusko-Morizet becomes Secretary of State for Economic Prospective and Development of digital economy (under Fillon);
Christine Boutin, formerly Minister of Housing and City becomes Minister of Housing;
Bernard Laporte becomes back Secretary of State for Sport;
Martin Hirsch becomes High Commissioner for Active Solidarities against Poverty and High Commissioner for Youth;
Létard, Amara, Morano and are now Secretaries of State with Hortefeux;
Woerth is now in charge of Evaluation of Public Policies;
Chantal Jouanno becomes Secretary of State for Ecology, replacing Nathalie Kosciusko-Morizet.

In June 2009 – After the European parliamentary elections

 Jean-Louis Borloo – Minister of State, Minister of Ecology, Energy, Sustainable Development and Sea, in charge of green technologies and of climate change negotiations;
 Michèle Alliot-Marie – Minister of State, Keeper of the seals, Minister of Justice and Freedoms;
 Brice Hortefeux – Minister of the Interior, Overseas and Territorial Collectivities;
 Xavier Darcos – Minister of Labour, Social Relations, Family and Solidarity;
 Éric Wœrth – Minister of Budget, Public Accounting, Civil Servants and Reform of the State;
 Luc Chatel – Minister of National Education, Spokesman of the Government;
 Bruno Le Maire – Minister of Food, Agriculture and Fishing;
 Frédéric Mitterrand – Minister of Culture and Communication;
 Michel Mercier – Minister of Rural Space and Spatial Planning;
 Henri de Raincourt – Minister of Parliamentary Relations (under Fillon);
 Christian Estrosi – Minister of Industry (under Lagarde);
 Valérie Létard – Secretary of State (under Borloo)
 Jean-Marie Bockel – Secretary of State (under Alliot-Marie);
 Hervé Novelli – Secretary of State for Commerce, Craftsmanship, Small and Medium Businesses, Tourism, Services and Consumer Rights (under Lagarde);
 Rama Yade – Secretary of State for Sport (under Bachelot-Narquin);
 Hubert Falco – Secretary of State for Defense and Veterans (under Morin);
 Nadine Morano – Secretary of State for Family and Solidarity (under Darcos);
 Pierre Lellouche – Secretary of State for European Affairs (under Kouchner);
 Nora Berra – Secretary of State for the Elderly (under Darcos);
 Benoist Apparu – Secretary of State for Housing and City (under Borloo);
 Marie-Luce Penchard – Secretary of State for Overseas (under Hortefeux);
 Christian Blanc – Secretary of State for the development of the «Région Capitale» (Region of Paris) (under Fillon).

In addition:

Bernard Kouchner;
Christine Lagarde;
Patrick Devedjian;
Valérie Pécresse;
Hervé Morin;
Roselyne Bachelot;
Eric Besson;
Laurent Wauquiez;
Nathalie Kosciusko-Morizet;
Dominique Bussereau;
Fadela Amara;
Alain Marleix;
Anne-Marie Idrac;
Alain Joyandet;
Chantal Jouanno;
Martin Hirsch;

keep their current functions.

References

François Fillon
Politics of France